Rodney Burford is an American actor, best known for his portrayal of Tony Hughes in the Netflix drama Dahmer - Monster: The Jeffrey Dahmer Story, which premiered in September 2022.

Early life and education
Rodney Burford Jr. was born in Brooklyn, New York. He attended Maryland School for the Deaf, before studying at Gallaudet University, a private federally chartered research university in Washington, D.C. for the education of the deaf and hard of hearing.

Career
In 2020, Burford made his screen debut in the reality television show Deaf U.

In 2022, Burford guest starred as Tony Hughes, one of serial killer Jeffrey Dahmer's victims, in the 10-part Netflix crime drama series Dahmer - Monster: The Jeffrey Dahmer Story. Amanda Whiting, writing for The Independent, described Burford's portrayal as "played with heartbreaking warmth" and praised the episode ("Silenced") in which he features predominantly.

Personal life
Burford is partially deaf, and has cochlear implants which help him to understand spoken language.

Filmography

References

External links 
 

21st-century American actors
Living people
Male actors from New York City
American television actors
Year of birth missing (living people)